Commodore Philemon F. Quaye (1924 – 29 August 2010) was a Ghanaian naval personnel, politician, diplomat and religious leader. He served as Chief of the Naval Staff of the Ghana Navy and as a senior officer in the Ghana Army as well. He served as Chief of Naval Staff of the Ghana Navy from 1 April 1969 to 15 May 1972. He was once Scripture Union International Council chairman. He was also active with World Vision International in Ghana and elsewhere.

See also
 Ghana Navy

External links
 Scripture Union International

References

1924 births
2010 deaths
Ghanaian diplomats
Ghanaian soldiers
Ghana Navy personnel